Kristin Eide is a Norwegian handball player. She played 33 matches for the national handball team from 1984 to 1989, and participated at the 1986 World Women's Handball Championship, where the Norwegian team won a bronze medal.

References

Year of birth missing (living people)
Living people
Norwegian female handball players